Destruction Inc. (1942) is the thirteenth of seventeen animated Technicolor short films based upon the DC Comics character of Superman. Produced by Famous Studios, the cartoon was originally released to theaters by Paramount Pictures on December 25, 1942.

Plot
One night in Metropolis, the elderly night watchman from the Metropolis Munitions Works is found dead in a swamp. When news of the incident reaches the city the next morning, Lois Lane and Clark Kent both decide to grab the story for themselves. Clark talks to Lois, not realizing she has already left and that he is talking to a bus driver named Louis. The bus driver gets angry at what he thinks was a mistake about his name. As Lois goes undercover at the plant after meeting with the plant supervisor in the Personnel Building, she meets the new night guard, a kindly, white-haired, old man leaving the Personnel MGR office.

 
Posing as a factory worker, Lois overhears the foreman informs two of the workers that Mr. Jones, one of the supervisors, wants them in his office upstairs at 12. During break time, the workers head up to Mr. Jones' office. Up in the office, Lois overhears Mr. Jones' plan to blow up the factory as the switch to the factory's night lights has been rigged to a case of dynamite. It is also revealed that the workers killed the night watchman to cover their tracks. Just then, Mr. Jones sees Lois outside the office window and opens the blinds, causing Lois to realize that she has been seen. Mr. Jones sends the workers to catch her. Lois manages to get away from the workers across a window ledge and beams, but is caught by the foreman. She is gagged and loaded inside a test torpedo with another case of dynamite. The night guard enters the room and rushes to help Lois after witnessing what's happening. However, the foreman stops the night guard by dropping several tons of scrap metal on him, seemingly killing him.

The torpedo is sent to the testing range and set to be fired at a dummy ship. Back inside the factory, the night guard is struggling to free himself from the rubble. As soon as he finally frees himself, the night guard is revealed to be Clark himself, having posed undercover as well to see what's going on. Having changed himself into Superman, Clark flies off to the test field.

As the test torpedo is fired, Superman rushes out to the testing range and saves Lois before the torpedo explodes. He frees Lois, who tells him that Mr. Jones is about to blow up the plant. Realizing that they've been discovered, Mr. Jones orders the foreman to throw the night guard's switch now, but Superman stops the foreman and the workers from throwing it fully before beating them down. Just when Mr. Jones thinks his plans are ruined, he spots a truck loaded with dynamite. He steers the truck toward the factory in a collision course, then jumps out before impact. Lois warns Superman about the truck, and he sends it over a cliff, saving the factory.

The story ends with Mr. Jones, the foreman and the workers being arrested for their crimes, and Lois revealing that she knew Clark was the night guard all along. It may have been meant as a subtle irony that Lois was able to see through this disguise easily but could not figure out that Clark was Superman as well.

Voice cast
 Bud Collyer as Clark Kent / Superman
 Joan Alexander as Lois Lane
 Jackson Beck as Chief Thug, Narrator
 Jack Mercer as Radio Newscaster, Louis
 Julian Noa as Narrator

References

External links
 Watch Destruction, Inc. (uncensored) in fully restored HD at Laugh Bureau Vintage
Destruction Inc. at the Internet Archive
Destruction Inc. at the Internet Movie Database

1942 films
1942 animated films
1940s American animated films
1940s animated short films
1940s animated superhero films
Superman animated shorts
Films directed by Isadore Sparber
Paramount Pictures short films